Zef Bushati (born 11 October 1953) is the ambassador of Albania to the Holy See since 10 May 2002. This followed the signing of an Agreement of Cooperation between Albania and the Holy See on 23 March 2002, which was at that time awaiting the ratification of the Albanian parliament.

A member and former chairman of the Demochristian Party of Albania, he has also served as a parliamentarian in Albania. While serving in that capacity, he was a member of an important Center-right coalition.

He was a forming member of the ethnic Albanian Christodemocrat Union across Kosovo, Croatia, and Albania.  At the organization's founding in Lucerne, Switzerland in 1995, Bushati was selected to serve its chairman at least until its first general congress.

Political activities

1991–1993 Vice Chairman of the Republican Party
1993–2000 Chairman of the Demochristian Party of Albania
1996 Chairman of the Union Albanian Christian Democratic (Albania & Kosovo)
1997–2001 Chairman of the Parliamentary Group "The Right of Centre", Parliamentary Commission of Economy, Finances and Privatisation, and Commission on Immunities Mandates and Rules of procedure.
1998– Member of Parliamentary Committee for the Drafting of the Constitution of Republic of Albania
2000–2002 Chairman of the Demochristian Party of Albania
2006–2009 The Political Secretary & Secretary of Foreign Affairs of the CDPA
2011– in progress Founder and President Christian Democratic Alliance Party of Albania

Professional experience

ZEF BUSHATI
1975 - 1992 Actor.
In 1975 graduated from the Academy of Fine Arts as Actor of dramatic art and film Director. The same year became actor in the National Theatre of Tirana. Since early experience, was entrusted to interpret main characters in plays such as the dramas "Fisherman's family'", "Our land" "A lady from the city", "Arturo Ui", "Year 61", etc. Zef Bushati was distinguished for his talent. In 19 years of artistic career, Zef Bushati interpreted 57 roles; to be mentioned the role of Mic Sokoli in Big Besa, Kabash Çaushi in Dawn of '45, Ferdinand in "Intrigue and Love – Luise Miller", Luigj Gurakuqi in "Journey of the journey", Paris in "Romeo e Juliet", Stanish in "Who did bring Doruntina?" which was his last role in the National Theatre of Tirana.
1979-1992 Director. Zef Bushati directed in the National Theatre and not without success. In 1978 put in stage Spring flows, and then Big Besa, "Dea's last tragedy", "Shadows in the night", "Monsarati",etc. In some he was actor and director simultaneously.
Cinematographer. Zef Bushati interpreted in the films Paths of war in the role of an Italian captain; "Spring Trip", "War Trails", "When separated from friends", "Our friend Tili", Parting from friends and excelled in the roles of Augusto, an Italian, in the film "Man with canon" and in the roles of Janos Captain in "Waxed shirts" ecc.
1982-1992 Lecturer. Zef Bushati lectured for 11 years in the Academy of Fine Arts in Tirana since 1982. His lectures about film production and classical music focused on interpretation skills, stage skills, artistic stature and stage diction.
1992–1995 Advisor in Council of Minister
1995–1997 Advisor of Prime Minister
1997–2001 Deputy in Parliament (Albanian Assembly)
2002–2006 Ambassador of Albania to the Holy See- Vatican
2006–2007 Advisor of Minister of Health
2007–2009 Vice Minister of Integration
2009–2010 Minister Plenipotentiary, Embassy of Albania in Italy
2011–2013 Advisor to the Minister of Tourism, Culture, Youth and Sports
2011– President Christian Democratic Alliance Party of Albania

Social activity

1993 Vice-President " Albanian Catholic Association"
2002 President " Foundation Pope Clemente XI- Albani "
2005 The General Director of the Economic and Cultural Institute Italian-Albanian
2006 The President of the "Political Christian Democratic Persecute Association of Albania"
2009 Delegate for the Albania the Noble Dynasty the Caputo Family Association
2010 Delegate of the Bonifaciana Academy for Albania
2011 Member of Scientific Committee Academies Bonifaciana of Rome -Italy 
2015 Representative for Albania of the Norman Academy in Rome, with the headquartered in Philadelphia USA.
2015 Grand Prior for Albania of the " Knights of St. Peter and St. Paul " with the headquarters in Melbourne, Australia.
2015 Grand Prior for Albania, Macedonia, Kosovo and Montenegro of the Order "Saint Michael the Archangel" with Headquarters California in America.
2015 To Represent the Royal House of Georgia in Albania
2016 Representatives of Albania for the Association of Cavalier of St. Sylvester Pope with the headquarters in Tivoli - Italy

Decoration

2002 Title diplomatic of "First Secretary"
2004 Knight First Class of the Grand Cross of the Order Plan issued by Pope John Paul II on 16 October 2004(Knight First Class of the Great Cross of Orders Plan)
2005 Apostolic Blessing of the Holy Father Pope Benedict XVI on the occasion of the 25th wedding anniversary.
2009 Title diplomatic of "Minister Plenipotentiary"
2010 Holds the title " Honorary Academic " & " Premium Bonifacio VIII for Peace " of Bonifaciana Academy, in Rome – Italy
2011 The title of "Honorary Member" of the Albanian Association of Friendship and Cooperation Albania – Italy
2011 Award " Excellence Vitaliano Brancati " - Sicily Italy
2011 President of the United States of America, Barack Obama, has awarded the prize in the field of " The President's Volunteer Service Award ", accompanied by a letter from "The White House" - Washington, which carries the signature of U.S. President Barack Obama.
2014 International Award "Giovanni Paolo II" from Academy Bonifaciana
2014 Academic Senator the Norman Academy & Ruggero II University of Roma with center Florida US in association with gold medal and Premium International "Capitoline the Gold"
2014 Acquisisce il Titolo "Accademico Meritato dell’Istituto degli Studi Storici Beato Pio IX
2014 Obtainment International Title from John Paul II 'Academy Bonifacio
2015 Obtainment the title "Academic Honor" of the Norman Academy in Rome
2015 Obtainment of the gold medal for Professional Merit by Norman Academy in Rome
2015 Obtainment of the title Knights of the Great Cross of Brothers "Campania Honored Hospital of the Holy Spirit"
2015 Obtainment of the title of Commander - Traditional Title Laksamana of the Royal House of Aranan
2016 Blessing from the Holy Father Pope Francis on the occasion of the Extraordinary Jubilee of Mercy
2016 Medals "The Eagle of gold" From Klik Ekspo Group Tirana - Albania
2016 The title "Doctor Honoris Causa in Political Science" by Ruggero II The University with the headquarters in Florida - US
2016 Gets the title "Gentleman" from the Cavalier Association of St. Sylvester with headquarters in Tivoli Center – Italy
2016 5th Ninth Special Certificate Issued by USA Congress for Outstanding and Invaluable Recognition in the Service to the Community
2016 With 5 Northeast Certified by the California Legislative Assembly in your Induction in the Order of Saint Michael the Trader For Exemplary Service and Commitment to Your Community.
2017 Laura "Doctor Honoris Cause for International Relationships" by the Academic Senate of the Scientific Research and Private University Studies in Grono – Switzerland
2018 International Saint Francis Award 2018 "Ambassador of Peace" granted by Cultur Ambiente & Nohe-UN Center for Peace - Rome Italy
2018 Title "Magister Honoris Causa in Diplomatic Sciences" for moral,ethical and religious values,granted by the Academic Senate of the Norman Academy Rome-Italy,signed by the President of the Academy Dr.Prof.Dr.Giulio Tarro PhdMD
2018 The Medal of the Gold "Law and Justice" by Norman Academy
2018 Medal of the Knight La Noble Company of Bernardo de Galvez - Spain. Brotherhood of Knights of Charity Society Bernardo De Galvez.
2019 Member of the Advisory Board. The Faculty of Modern African Studies functions as a college entity within the Logos University International, which operates under the provisions of the Board of Education of the State of Florida, US
2019 Member of the Advisory Board Catholic University of New Spain (UCNE) Miami Florida
2019 Honorary member of the Istituto Nazionale Azzurro
2019 Companion Grand Cross of the Rose- The Most Honourable Order of Christian Knights of the Rose – Canada
2020 Noble Vice Prince of Nueftra Senora de Sion - Brazil
2020 No. 6 in the Role of Honor of Association "National Union Awarded to the Merit of the Italian Republic (UNIMRI)
2020 The Golden Cross from the Association "La Laterna" International Artistic Cenacle of Fine Arts, Sciences, Work, Sport and Entertainment, for the tireless work and favor of Harmony and Peace among Peoples.
2020 USA President's Education Awards Program, Title "Autstanding Academic Excellence" signed by USA President Mr. Donald Trump
2020 Knight of the Order of the Knights of the Queen of Heaven (Ordo Equestris Reginae Caeli - Germany)
2021 Special Lifetime Achievement Award "Constantinus Magnus 2021 International Award"
2021 Honorary Academician of the Centro Studi Delfico Foundation for Merits in Social Life and Culture.

References

External links

1953 births
Living people
Ambassadors of Albania to the Holy See
Albanian Roman Catholics
Demochristian Party of Albania politicians